Ramsgill railway station was a station on the Nidd Valley Light Railway in Nidderdale in Yorkshire, England. It opened in 1907 and closed in 1930. It was located in Bouthwaite,  from the village of Ramsgill, then in the West Riding of Yorkshire but now in North Yorkshire.  The station is now a private residence, though the platform can still be seen.

References

External links 

Disused railway stations in North Yorkshire
Railway stations in Great Britain opened in 1907
Railway stations in Great Britain closed in 1930
Nidderdale